Hwang Hui (1363 – 1452) was a politician of the Goryeo and Joseon dynasties, who came from the Jangsu Hwang clan and once served as prime minister of the Joseon dynasty from 1431 to 1449.

Biography 
Hwang Hui was an official of the Goryeo dynasty. He became an official in the Joseon dynasty in 1394. Hwang Hui was once banished from Seoul because he advocated Yangnyeong, the eldest prince of King Taejong, despite his bad behavior in 1418. After King Sejong the Great's enthronement, Hwang Hui got reappointed and held many ministerial posts. Hwang Hui was appointed as a prime minister in 1431 and served until 1449. He retired from the government after 18 years.

Achievement 
He distributed grain seeds for improving farming, and ordered each province to plant a lot of mulberry trees to enrich human life. In addition, the publication of 'economic land' was divided into '續 典' and '集', which allowed the contents to be duplicated, omitted or separated from the content and reality.

Meanwhile, a defense measure was taken to prevent the North's wildling and southern regions by paying attention to defense issues. And in an effort to obtain a wide range of good manners, the etiquette of Goryeo was revised and supplemented, taking into account the reality of the Ming and Joseon dynasties.

Description of Hwang Hui 
He served as the Yeonguijeong, the highest ranking of three appointed royal prime ministers (the others being Uuijeong and Jwaguijeong) for a total of 18 years with a total of 24 years service to the monarchy. He was noted for his political philosophy that stated, “That which is just takes priority and must be enacted.” Priorities during his administration included agricultural improvement, mitigating laws that increased social class gaps, and providing opportunities for candidates born out of wedlock or from concubines to take the civil service examination.

Family
Father: Hwang Gun-seo (황군서, 黃君瑞; 1328–1402)
Grandfather: Hwang Gyun-bi (황균비, 黃均庇)
Grandmother: Lady Kang of the Jinju Kang clan (진주 강씨)
Mother: Lady Kim of the Yonggung Kim clan (용궁 김씨; d. 1427) – initially a slave who become Hwang Gun-seo's concubine.
Grandfather: Gim Woo (김우, 金佑)
Older brother: Hwang Jung-su (황중수, 黃中粹)
Older sister: Lady Hwang (황씨)
Older sister: Lady Hwang (황씨)
Older sister: Lady Hwang (황씨)
Wives and children:
Lady Choe (최씨); daughter of Choe-An (최안, 崔安)
1st daughter: Lady Hwang (황씨)
Lady Yang of the Cheongju Yang clan (정경부인 청주 양씨); daughter of Yang Jin (양진, 楊震) and they married in 1388.
1st son: Hwang Chi-sin (황치신, 黃致身)
Grandson: Hwang Sa-chin (황사친, 黃事親)
Grandson: Hwang Sa-jang (황사장, 黃事長)
Grandson: Hwang Sa-hyeon (황사현, 黃事賢)
Grandson: Hwang Sa-hyeong (황사형, 黃事兄)
Grandson: Hwang Sa-chung (황사충, 黃事忠)
Grandson: Hwang Sa-hyo (황사효, 黃事孝)
Grandson: Hwang Sa-gong (황사공, 黃事恭)
Grandson: Hwang Sa-ui (황사의, 黃事義)
Grandson: Hwang Sa-gyeong (황사경, 黃事敬)
2nd son: Hwang Bo-sin (황보신, 黃保身)
Grandson: Hwang U-hyeong (황우형, 黃友兄)
Grandson: Hwang Jong-hyeong (황종형, 黃從兄)
Grandson: Hwang Gyeong-hyeong (황경형, 黃敬兄)
Grandson: Hwang Gong-hyeong (황공형, 黃恭兄)
3rd son: Hwang Su-sin (황수신, 黃守身)
Daughter-in-law: Lady Kim of the Ilseon Kim clan (정경부인 일선 김씨)
Grandson: Hwang Sin (황신, 黃?)
Grandson: Hwang Chal (황찰, 黃察)
Grandson: Hwang Seong (황성, 黃省)
Grandson: Hwang Uk (황욱, 黃旭)
4th son: Hwang Jik-sin (황직신, 黃直身);
Grandson: Hwang Sam-woe (황삼외, 黃三畏)
Granddaughter: Lady Hwang (황씨)
2nd daughter: Lady Hwang (황씨)
Son-in-law: Ki Jil (기질) of the Haengju Ki clan
Grandson: Gi Si-gyeong (기시경)

In popular culture
 Portrayed by Kim Kap-soo in the 2008 KBS2 TV series King Sejong the Great
 Portrayed by Jeon Seung-hwan in the 2011 SBS TV series Deep Rooted Tree.
 Portrayed by Baek Yoon-sik in the 2012 film I Am the King.
 Portrayed by Kim Kap-soo in the 2015 MBC TV series Splash Splash Love.
 Portrayed by Kwon Hwa-woon in the 2015-2016 SBS TV series Six Flying Dragons.
 Portrayed by Jung Han-yong in the 2016 KBS1 TV series Jang Yeong-sil.

See also 
 Sejong the Great
 Maeng Saseong

References

1363 births
Joseon politicians
15th-century Korean people
1452 deaths
Jangsu Hwang clan